Saint Nissen was an early Christian convert who was abbot of a monastery in County Wexford, Ireland.

Life

Saint Nissen was converted to Christianity by Saint Patrick. He became abbot of Montgarth (Mountgarret) Abbey in Wexford, Ireland.
His feast day is 25 July.

Monks of Ramsgate account

The monks of St Augustine's Abbey, Ramsgate, wrote in their Book of Saints (1921),

Butler's account

The hagiographer Alban Butler ( 1710–1773) wrote in his Lives of the Primitive Fathers, Martyrs, and Other Principal Saints, under April 9,

Notes

Sources

 

 

Disciples of Saint Patrick
5th-century deaths